Trilliam 2 is the second extended play by American rapper Aha Gazelle. It was his first project since signing with Reach Records. It was released on June 9, 2017 via iTunes and Spotify. It is to be followed by Trilliam 3, scheduled for release on November 3, 2017, the final installment in a trilogy of EPs that began with Trilliam in 2016.

Promotion
The EP's first single "Momma House" was released April 21, 2017 and its accompanying music video on May 23, 2017. "Keep It in the Family" was released as a promotional single on June 20, 2017 and was featured in an episode of Comedy Central's Hood Adjacent with James Davis.

Critical reception

The album has received positive reviews since its release.

Track listing
 All tracks produced by William G. Fields Jr.

References

2017 EPs
Aha Gazelle albums